Roelof Klein (7 June 1877 – 12 February 1960) was a Dutch rower who competed at the 1900 Summer Olympics in Paris. Klein was part of the Dutch eight team that won a bronze medal with Hermanus Brockmann as the coxswain. Brockmann also steered the boat of Klein and François Brandt in the coxed pairs semifinal, which they lost to France. The pair realized that the 60 kg weight of Brockmann puts them in disadvantage; they replaced him with a local boy of 33 kg and won the final narrowly beating the French team.

Klein had a degree in mechanical engineering and worked abroad for the Shell company. In 1910 he immigrated to the United States and died there in 1960.

References

External links

1877 births
1960 deaths
Dutch male rowers
Olympic rowers of the Netherlands
Rowers at the 1900 Summer Olympics
Olympic gold medalists for the Netherlands
Olympic bronze medalists for the Netherlands
Sportspeople from Friesland
People from De Fryske Marren
Olympic medalists in rowing
Dutch emigrants to the United States
Medalists at the 1900 Summer Olympics